Chansons des mers froides (French: Songs from the Cold Seas) is a 1994 album by French musician Hector Zazou.

Zazou approached Sony Records with merely the title and the concept of songs from the Arctic. He was accompanied by cameraman Philippe Roméo as he recorded traditional folk songs in and from Alaska, Canada (Newfoundland), Greenland, Iceland, Japan, Scandinavia and Scotland. He incorporated the shamanic incantations and lullabies of aboriginal people such as the Ainu, Inuit, Nanai, and Yakuts.

The only original composition, "The Long Voyage", was written by Zazou as an expression of gratitude to his record company for granting him complete artistic freedom on the project. The song was released as a single and featured several remixes, including one by Mad Professor and by Zazou himself.

As lyrics no longer exist for the traditional song "Annukka Suaren Neito" Sari Kaasinen of Varttina wrote lyrics based on the folk tale of the young girl Annukka who wants to marry a man who lives in the ocean.

The song "Adventures in the Scandinavian Skin Trade" was remixed by William Orbit but never released.

Contributing musicians
Ainu Dancers of Hokkaidō, Balanescu Quartet, Budgie, Barbara Gogan, Mark Isham, Lightwave, Sakharine Percussion Group, Brendan Perry (of Dead Can Dance), Noriko Sanagi, Marina Schmidt, Guy Sigsworth, Sissimut Dance Drummers

Track listing
"Annukka Suaren Neito" – Värttinä
"Vísur Vatnsenda-Rósu" – Björk
"The Long Voyage" – Suzanne Vega & John Cale
"Havet Stormar" – Lena Willemark
"Adventures in the Scandinavian Skin Trade" – Wimme Saari
"She's Like a Swallow" – Jane Siberry
"The Lighthouse" – Siouxsie
"Oran na Maighdean Mhara" – Catherine-Ann MacPhee
"Yaisa Maneena" – Tokiko Kato
"Iacoute Song" – Lioudmila Khandi
"Song of the Water" – Kilabuk & Nooveya

References

1994 albums
Hector Zazou albums